The Zee Cine Award Best Playback Singer - Male is chosen by the jury of Zee Entertainment Enterprises as part of its annual award ceremony for Hindi films, to recognise a male playback singer. Following its inception in 1998, no ceremony was held in 2009 and 2010, but the ceremony resumed in 2011.

Superlatives

Most Wins

List of Nominees and Winners

1990s

2000s

2010s

2020s

References

See also
 Zee Cine Awards
 Bollywood
 Cinema of India

Zee Cine Awards